Teodoro Mendes Tavares (born 7 January 1964) is a Cape Verdean clergyman and the first and only Cape Verdean-born bishop of any diocese in Brazil, he is currently the third Catholic bishop of Ponta de Pedras, covering the Marajó Archipelago in Pará

Biography
He was born in the parish of São Miguel, once in the municipality of Tarrafal, now in the municipality of São Miguel.

Teodoro Tavares studied philosophy at the High Institute of Theology (Instituto Superior de Teologia) in Braga, a campus of the Faculty of Theology of the Catholic University of Portugal from 1986 to 1987. He later studied theology at the Faculty of Theology at the Catholic University of Portugal from 1988 to 1993.

In 1995, he obtained the title as master at Trinity College, Dublin, where he presented a dissertation "The Churches and the European Immigration Policy in the Light of the Schengen and Dublin Agreement".

He was ordained as priest on June 11, 1993 and went on a mission to Brazil in 1994 to the Prelate of Tefé, in Amazonas state, first he was vicar-general, from 2001 until 2011, he was parish priest in Alvarães, Carauari and Uarini.

He was ordained bishop on 8 May 2011 on his native island of Santiago by Alberto Taveira Corrêa.

On September 23, 2015, he became bishop of the diocese of Ponta de Pedras in Pará.

References

External links
Teodoro Mendes Tavares at catholic-hierarchy.org

1964 births
Living people
21st-century Roman Catholic bishops in Brazil
People from Santiago, Cape Verde
Cape Verdean Roman Catholic bishops
Roman Catholic bishops of Ponta de Pedras
Roman Catholic bishops of Belém do Pará